Captain Jonathan Greeley, also spelled Jonathan Greely, (December 9, 1741 – 1781) was an American sea captain. He was captain and co-owner of the schooner Speedwell, which was scuttled by a British frigate off the coast of Marblehead, Massachusetts, in 1781, during the American Revolutionary War.

Life and career
Greeley was born on December 9, 1741, in North Yarmouth, Province of Massachusetts Bay (now in Maine), to Philip and Hannah. His father was killed by Native Americans in North Yarmouth in 1746, when Jonathan was five years old.

Greeley married Mary Hitchborn (1742–1819) on December 15, 1768. They had six children, each of whom were born in Boston: Anna (born 1769), Mary (1771), Hannah (1773), Isannah (1775–1800), Frances (1777) and Elizabeth (1778).

Death
Greeley was killed in 1781 when his privateer, Speedwell, was scuttled by a British frigate off the coast of Marblehead, Massachusetts, during the Revolutionary War. The ship was carrying eight guns (another source says ten), twelve swivels and 70 men. His commander sent his body and his sword to his family. Greeley was formerly a commander of the vessel, a petition for his installment being signed by Thomas Melvill in 1776.

References

People from North Yarmouth, Maine
1741 births
1781 deaths
Sea captains
United States military personnel killed in the American Revolutionary War